Pearson Peak is a rock peak rising 1 nautical mile (1.9 km) south of McGaw Peak on the ridge that trends south from Mount McCoy, coastal Marie Byrd Land. Mapped by United States Geological Survey (USGS) from surveys and U.S. Navy air photos, 1959–65. Named by Advisory Committee on Antarctic Names (US-ACAN) for Herbert E. Pearson, United States Antarctic Research Program (USARP) geomagnetician and seismologist at Byrd Station, 1963.

Mountains of Marie Byrd Land